Lucas Niang (born August 18, 1998) is an American football offensive tackle for the Kansas City Chiefs of the National Football League (NFL). He played college football at Texas Christian University (TCU) and was drafted by the Chiefs in the third round of the 2020 NFL Draft.

Early years
Niang grew up in New Canaan, Connecticut, where he became a football star at New Canaan High School. He was born in New York City and lived in Geneva, Switzerland from the ages of 4 to 6. His family moved to New Canaan, Connecticut when they returned to the US. Niang started to play football with the Pop Warner league in New Canaan in 3rd grade. Niang also played basketball and tennis growing up. Playing both offensive and defensive line in high school, he helped lead the Rams to state championships in 3 straight seasons from 2013 to 2015, before committing to play college football at TCU. At New Canaan, Niang was a two time All-FCIAC selection as a Junior and Senior, and during his Senior Season was an All-State First-team Selection, from both the Coaches Association and New Haven Register.

College career
Niang was highly recruited coming out of high school. He had around 40 scholarship offers from schools including TCU, Penn State, Auburn, Miami, and Georgia, and decided to enroll at TCU. After enrolling at TCU in 2016, Niang played in 12 of the Horned Frogs' 13 games as a true freshman that fall. He became a starter midway through his sophomore season in 2017, helping lead the Frogs to the program's first-ever berth in the Big 12 Championship Game and a win in the 2017 Alamo Bowl over Stanford.

Starting all 13 games at right tackle for TCU as a junior in 2018, Niang didn't allow a sack the entire season and earned 2nd Team All-Big 12 honors  before helpling lead the Frogs to a win over California in the 2018 Cheez-It Bowl.

Prior to his senior season, Niang was named 1st Team Preseason All-Big 12, and The Athletic named him as one of the top offensive linemen in college football. Hall of Fame NFL executive Gil Brandt has named Niang as one of the top offensive line prospects for the 2020 NFL Draft, and ESPN draft expert Todd McShay has projected Niang as a first-round selection and best offensive tackle in the 2020 NFL Draft.

Niang was forced to end his senior season early after TCU pulled out an upset win against the University of Texas in late October 2019. He had been advised by his doctor the week before to get surgery to repair a torn hip labrum he had been playing through since the beginning of the season to avoid the risk of a more severe injury.

Niang played as a true freshman in 12 games out of 13. He became a starter as a sophomore and in his 28 games and three-year span as a starter for TCU, he never allowed a single sack. Over that period, he only had two holding calls and no false starts.

Professional career
Niang was drafted by the Kansas City Chiefs in the third round with the 96th overall pick of the 2020 NFL Draft. On August 6, 2020, he announced he would opt out of the 2020 season due to the COVID-19 pandemic.

Niang was named the Chiefs starting right tackle to begin the 2021 season. He started seven of the first nine games, missing two with a shoulder injury, before suffering a ribs injury in Week 9. He missed the next four games. He made his first start at left tackle in Week 17 but suffered a torn patellar tendon in the game. He was placed on injured reserve on January 7, 2022.

On August 23, 2022, Niang was placed on the reserve/PUP list. He was activated from the reserve/PUP list three months later. Niang became a Super Bowl champion when the Chiefs won Super Bowl LVII against the Philadelphia Eagles.

Personal life
Niang's parents moved to the United States from France and he is fluent in his parents' native language of French, despite being born in New York. His father is from France (with Senegalese and Belgian ancestry)and his mother is from France (with Ivorian and Malian ancestry).

References

External links
Kansas City Chiefs bio
TCU Horned Frogs bio

1998 births
Living people
American football offensive linemen
French players of American football
Kansas City Chiefs players
People from New Canaan, Connecticut
Players of American football from Connecticut
Sportspeople from Fairfield County, Connecticut
TCU Horned Frogs football players
American people of French descent
American people of Ivorian descent